Eucampia is a genus of marine centric diatoms. It was first described by Ehrenberg in 1839.

Species
 Eucampia antarctica
 Eucampia cornuta
 Eucampia groenlandica
 Eucampia zodiacus

References

Coscinodiscophyceae
Diatom genera